The Ministry of Defence of Armenia often abbreviated to the RA Ministry of Defence is an Armenian governmental agency in charge of overseeing the development of the Armed Forces of Armenia. The Ministry of Defense is also the executive body which implements the policies of the Armenian Government in the defense sector. It particularly oversees the budget of the armed forces and ensures the safety of troops. It is located on 5 Bagrevand Street, Yerevan. The ministry was officially established on 28 January 1992 by decree of the President of Armenia.

History 
On 5 December 1991, by the decision of the Government of the Armenian SSR, the State Defense Committee under the Council of Ministers was created. The first head of this department was Vazgen Sargsyan. On 28 January 1992, the Government of Armenia adopted a resolution "On the Ministry of Defense of the Republic of Armenia", which was actually a renaming of the previously created State Defense Committee. Sargsyan was appointed the first Minister of Defense of Armenia. The police patrol and special operations regiment of the Ministry of Internal Affairs of Armenia, the civil defense regiment of the Civil Defense Headquarters of the Republic of Armenia and the republican military commissariat were transferred to the subordination of the newly formed ministry. The next step was the creation of the central apparatus of the Ministry of Defense, which included the Main Headquarters and management. In May 1992, the Ministry of Defense carried out the first conscription of military servicemen on the territory of the republic. The formation of the military department coincided with the beginning of large-scale operations in the First Nagorno-Karabakh War, in which the Armed Forces of Armenia actively participated. The Ministry of Defense was directly involved in the command of the Armenian forces in the territory of Nagorno-Karabakh and the formations of the Artsakh Defense Army. At the end of hostilities in early 1994, the military department of Armenia began the process of military reformation.

Building 
It is currently located at a building on 5 Bagrevand Street, Yerevan. In 1993, the building of the former hospital complex was handed over to the Ministry for the construction of a new building complex of the Ministry of Defense, but due to the lack of financial means, no construction was initiated. On the day of the 17th anniversary of Armenia's independence in 2008, the new building of the Ministry of Defense was officially opened. The main buildings of the complex, which covers an area of about 26 hectares, housed the Minister and his staff, the General Staff's Operative and Communication Department, rear services, a board hall for 380 people, a banquet hall, a canteen, fitness halls, and clinics.  Auxiliary buildings include a swimming pool, boiler room, sports grounds and complex, checkpoints, barracks, centralized communication system, shooting range, a closed and spacious parking lot and a large helipad. The construction cost of the complex was 13 billion drams. The Russian "Ingeocom-Yerevan" company was recognized as the general contractor for the construction of the complex.

Structure

Apparatus 
Collegium’s Work Organization Division
Insignia Division
Supervisory Department
Administrative Division
Analytical Division
Secretariat Division

Departments subordinated to the Ministry 
 Defense Policy Department
 Finance, Budget and Planning Department
 Capital Construction and Housing Department
 Internal Audit Department
 Information and Public Affairs Department
 HR and Education Department
 Legal Department
 Social Security Department
Logistics Department

Services 
 Conscription and Mobilization Service
 Central Military-Medical Committee
 Central Clinical Military Hospital
Military Medical Training Centre
 Human Rights and Integrity Building Centre
 Council of the Union of Veterans of the Ministry of Defense
Military Control Service of the Ministry of Defense

Central Clinical Military Hospital 
It was created on March 15, 1994 in Yerevan. In May 2020, the surgical department, the neurosurgery department and the anesthesia department were named after Major Sergey Harutyunyan, Captain Karo Heboyan and Lieutenant Tigran Hovesyan, who were killed in a helicopter crash in early January 2000.

Other units and subordinate institutions 
 Military Police
 12th Peacekeeping Brigade
 Special Forces Regiment
 Separate Regiment of Protection
 Honour Guard Company
BKMA Yerevan
Army Chaplaincy Program of the Armenian Church
Song and Dance Ensemble

Military Police 
The Military Police fall under the command of the Ministry of Defence, being considered to be a division that is separate from the central apparatus. The Military Police was established in May 1992 and had no special status until 2007, when a law to define the Military Police status was adopted. Its status is defined in the RA Law on Military Police, which says that the Military Police is responsible for the investigation of military crimes in the armed forces that were committed on the territory of military units and the deterrence of crimes being planned or committed by military servicemen. The Military Police Bylaws were approved by the Government of Armenia on 25 December 2008.

The military police is in control of the peacekeeping brigade.

Separate Regiment of Protection 

The Separate Regiment of Protection is a security unit of the armed forces under the ministry. The Honour Guard Company falls under its command. it descends from the Yerevan Special Regiment, founded on 20 September 1990 with 26 platoons from Yerevan. In 2008, the regiment, as this point known as the Capital Regiment, handed over its territory to the Armenian Peacekeeping Brigade, moving to a different location. It has taken part in the 2010, 2015 and 2020 Moscow Victory Day Parades on Red Square. It is currently led by Colonel Ashot Hakobyan a graduate of the Moscow Higher Military Command School. The Armenian contingent at the 2010 parade was led by the grandson of Soviet Armenian Marshal Sergei Khudyakov, Lieutenant Colonel Vardan Khanferyants. The contingent's color guard held the flag of the 89th Rifle Division in the latter two parades.

Chaplaincy Program 
The Army Chaplaincy Program of the Armenian Apostolic Church (the national church of Armenia) is made up of more than 50 clergymen who currently serve as military chaplains to the Armed Forces. It is jointly funded and sponsored by the Ministry of Defence and the church.

Ensemble 
The song and dance ensemble was formed in June 2010. The conscripts are admitted into the ensemble following an evaluation divided into these main parts:

 Classical dances
 Armenian folk dance
 Foreign folk dances
 Force movements
 Perception of rhythm

Razmik Marukyan, a ballet dancer and soloist at the Alexander Spendiaryan Opera and Ballet National Theatre, has been a part of the ensemble. As part of the International Army Games 2020, it performed at the Partnership Without Borders National Cultural Festival in Moscow.

List of ministers

See also 
 Government of Armenia

External links 
 Official Site
 Official Newspaper
 ԶԻՆՈՒԺ MEDIA on YouTube

References

Ministry of Defence (Armenia)
Armenia
Government ministries of Armenia
Armenia
1992 establishments in Armenia